Dr. José Rafael Espada (born January 14, 1944 in Guatemala City) is a former Vice President of Guatemala and a former cardiothoracic surgeon.

Life and career
Espada is well known in the Houston cardiothoracic surgery community. He grew up in Guatemala. From an early age he wanted to grow up to be a doctor. Espada received his doctorate degree at the Universidad de San Carlos de Guatemala (USAC) in Guatemala and performed his surgery internship residency training in general and thoracic surgery at Baylor College of Medicine. He also received subspecialty training from LeClub Mitrale, France; and other highly recognized international institutions. He was a resident of West University Place, Texas, United States, a city surrounded by Houston.

He was employed at the Methodist DeBakey Heart Center in Houston, Texas, and a professor of cardiothoracic surgery at the Baylor College of Medicine. Espada was known to travel from Houston to Guatemala on a monthly basis, to treat underprivileged patients requiring special cardiothoracic procedures. As a cardiac surgeon, he was best known for performing Pulmonary Thromboembolectomies.

He has raised money for a charity hospital in Guatemala, and currently are building a state-of-the-art facility specifically designed for cardiothoracic surgery. He performed an average of 10 charity surgeries out of the US every month.

He was also board-certified in General Surgery. While at Houston, performed nearly 1000 cardiothoracic procedures a year and around 400 in Guatemala. Espada has received numerous awards and recognitions throughout the course of his medical career including: Honorary Doctorate from the University of Francisco Marroquin in Guatemala, Honorary Professor from Universidad La Salle in Mexico City, Governors award from The Chest Foundation, Paul Harris Award from the International Rotary Society, among many others.

Since 1981 he has been related with the Brazilian Vascular Society and received in Houston, Texas many Brazilian doctors, that learned with him the best techniques on cardiovascular surgery. He was the main guest speaker for the Vascular Meeting of the Brazilian Society in Rio de Janeiro, in June 1998. In 1992 Espada was honored with an honorary doctorate degree in science by Universidad Francisco Marroquín.

He recently stepped down from his position at Houston's Methodist Hospital/DeBakey Heart Institute and returned to his native Guatemala. There, he successfully ran for Vice President of Guatemala. On January 14, 2008, he took office alongside the President, Álvaro Colom.

Affiliations
Dr. Espada is vice chairman of the board of directors of the Washington-based think-tank Global Financial Integrity.

Sources
http://www.pinnaclecare.com/finding/mab/physicians/phcphysicianbio.2005-07-28.9726418592/phcphysicianbio_view
http://www.tmc.edu/tmcnews/05_15_01/page_05.html

References

External links
Honorary Doctoral Degrees, Universidad Francisco Marroquín

Living people
People from Guatemala City
Guatemalan surgeons
Vice presidents of Guatemala
1944 births
Universidad de San Carlos de Guatemala alumni
National Unity of Hope politicians
21st-century Guatemalan politicians
20th-century surgeons
21st-century surgeons
Baylor College of Medicine alumni
Baylor College of Medicine faculty